Darlow is a surname. Notable people with the surname include:

Cynthia Darlow (born 1949), American actress

Julia Donovan Darlow, American attorney
Karl Darlow (born 1990), British footballer
Kieran Darlow (born 1982), British footballer
Michael Darlow (born 1934), British television producer, director, and writer
Scott Darlow (born 1983), Australian singer, songwriter, guitarist, didgeridoo player, and public speaker
Sue Darlow (1960-2011), Indian photographer